Cox's Ridge (1974–1998) was an American Thoroughbred racehorse. He bypassed the U.S. Triple Crown series and had considerable success in 1977 and 1978 with his most important win coming in the Metropolitan Handicap. In 1979, the five-year-old Cox's Ridge won the Tom Fool Handicap, ran second in the Whitney Handicap, and finished first in the Philip H. Iselin Stakes but was disqualified for interference and placed second.

Retired to stud, Cox's Ridge was a very successful sire whose offspring includes millionaires:
 Life's Magic (b. 1981) - 1984 American Champion Three-Year-Old Filly, 1985 American Champion Older Female Horse, career earnings of $2,255,218
 Little Missouri (b. 1982) - won Brooklyn Handicap, sired 1993 Preakness Stakes winner, Prairie Bayou
 Vanlandingham (b. 1981) - 1985 American Champion Older Male Horse, won G1s Jockey Club Gold Cup, Washington, D.C. International Stakes, Suburban Handicap, retired with career earnings of $1,616,276
 Cardmania (b. 1986), 1993 American Champion Sprint Horse, winner of $1,543,178,
 De Roche (b. 1986) - multiple stakes winner of $1,078,200
 Lost Mountain (b. 1988 ) - won G1 Haskell Invitational Handicap, career earnings of $1,004,939
 Sultry Song (b. 1988) - won Grade 1s Hollywood Gold Cup, Woodward Stakes, career earnings of $1,616,276

References
 Cox's Ridge's pedigree and partial racing stats

1974 racehorse births
1998 racehorse deaths
Racehorses bred in Kentucky
Racehorses trained in the United States
Thoroughbred family 12-b